Dendronotidae is a family of sea slugs, nudibranchs, marine gastropod mollusks in the superfamily Dendronotoidea. 
This family is within the clade Cladobranchia (according to the taxonomy of the Gastropoda by Bouchet & Rocroi, 2005).

Description
Animals within this family have elongated bodies with numerous branching cerata on their dorsal sides. The cerata contain extensions from the digestive gland which vary in extent between species. The head has an oral veil having branching extensions. The lamellate rhinophores are surrounded by a sheath and branched extensions.

Genera and species

Dendronotus
Dendronotus albopunctatus Robilliard, 1972
Dendronotus albus MacFarland, 1966 (synonym: Dendronotus diversicolor Robilliard, 1972)
Dendronotus arcticus Korshunova, Sanamyan, Zimina, Fletcher & Martynov, 2016
Dendronotus bathyvela Martynov, Fujiwara, Tsuchida, R. Nakano, N. Sanamyan, K. Sanamyan, Fletcher & Korshunova, 2020
Dendronotus claguei Valdés, Lundsten & N. G. Wilson, 2018
Dendronotus comteti Valdés & Bouchet, 1998
Dendronotus dalli Bergh, 1879
Dendronotus elegans A. E. Verrill, 1880
Dendronotus europaeus Korshunova, Martynov, Bakken & Picton, 2017
Dendronotus frondosus (Ascanius, 1774) (synonyms: D. arborescens, D. reynoldsi)
Dendronotus gracilis Baba, 1949
Dendronotus iris J.G. Cooper, 1863 (synonym D. giganteus)
Dendronotus jamsteci Martynov, Fujiwara, Tsuchida, R. Nakano, N. Sanamyan, K. Sanamyan, Fletcher & Korshunova, 2020
Dendronotus kalikal Ekimova, Korshunova, Schepetov, Neretina, Sanamyan & Martynov, 2015
Dendronotus kamchaticus Ekimova, Korshunova, Schepetov, Neretina, Sanamyan & Martynov, 2015
Dendronotus lacteus (W. Thompson, 1840)
Dendronotus nordenskioeldi Korshunova, Bakken, Grøtan, Johnson, Lundin & Martynov, 2020
Dendronotus patricki Stout, N. G. Wilson & Valdés, 2011
Dendronotus primorjensis Martynov, Sanamyan & Korshunova, 2015
Dendronotus robilliardi Korshunova, Sanamyan, Zimina, Fletcher & Martynov, 2016
Dendronotus robustus Verrill, 1870
Dendronotus rufus O'Donoghue, 1921
Dendronotus subramosus MacFarland, 1966
Dendronotus velifer G. O. Sars, 1878
Dendronotus venustus MacFarland, 1966
Dendronotus yrjargul Korshunova, Bakken, Grøtan, Johnson, Lundin & Martynov, 2020
Dendronotus zakuro Martynov, Fujiwara, Tsuchida, R. Nakano, N. Sanamyan, K. Sanamyan, Fletcher & Korshunova, 2020
Cabangus
Cabangus noahi (Pola & Stout, 2008)
Cabangus regius (Pola & Stout, 2008)
Pseudobornella
Pseudobornella orientalis Baba, 1932

References

 
Taxa named by George Allman (natural historian)